The 2018–19 GFA Premier League is the 35th season of the GFA Premier League, the top division football competition in Grenada. The season began on 24 August 2018.

Team information

League table

Results

Season Statistics

Top Scorers

Hat-tricks

4 Player scored 4 goals

References

External links
Grenada Football Association

2018–19
Grenada
1